Isaac of Alexandria may refer to:

 Pope Isaac of Alexandria, ruled in 690–692
 Patriarch Isaac of Alexandria, Greek Patriarch of Alexandria in 941–954